Akhara is an organization of the different sects of sadhu, Vairaghi, yogi or Hindu renunciates.

Akhara may also refer to:

 Akhara (album), the third album released by Punjabi Bhangra artist Kulwinder Dhillon
 Akhara, Bhogpur, a village in Punjab, India
 Akhada, a school for Indian wrestling 
 Akhada (book), the autobiography of the Indian wrestling coach Mahavir Singh Phogat

See also
 Akhil Bharatiya Akhara Parishad
 Nirmohi Akhara
 Shri Dattatreya Akhara
 Guru Hanuman Akhara
 Nashipur Akhara